Ricardo Antonio Vega (born 20 December 1982) is a  Nicaraguan footballer who currently is a free agent.

Club career
Born in Nicaragua, Vega made his senior debut with Scorpion FC. He later played for Deportivo Masatepe, then joined Nicaraguan giants Real Esteli F.C. and going on to play three more clubs Deportivo Ocotal, Deportivo Walter Ferretti and Chinandega FC. He has become a prolific goalscorers scoring 126 goals over five clubs making him the third highest goalscorer in Nicaragua primera division

International career

He made his senior debut for Nicaragua in a February 2008 World Cup qualification match against Netherlands Antilles and has earned a total of 6 caps, scoring 2 goals. He has represented his country in 2 FIFA World Cup qualification matches and played four friendlies against Puerto Rico.

His final international was a Friendly match against Puerto Rico.

International goals
Scores and results list Nicaraguas' goal tally first.

References

External links

Ricardo Vega at playmakerstats.com (English version of ceroacero.es)

1982 births
Living people
Association football forwards
Nicaraguan men's footballers
Nicaragua international footballers
Real Estelí F.C. players